Benthodesmus is a genus of fish in the family Trichiuridae. There are at least eleven species in this genus, which are known as frostfish. These are not to be confused with Microgadus tomcod and  Lepidopus caudatus also known as frostfish.

Species
The World Register of Marine Species lists the following species:
 Benthodesmus elongates, Clarke, 1879 (Elongate frostfish)
 Benthodesmus macrophthalmus, Parin & Becker, 1970 (Bigeye frostfish)
 Benthodesmus neglectus,  Parin, 1976 (Neglected frostfish)
 Benthodesmus oligoradiatus, Parin & Becker, 1970 (Sparse-rayed frostfish)
 Benthodesmus pacificus, Parin & Becker, 1970 (North Pacific frostfish)
 Benthodesmus papua, Parin, 1978 (Papuan frostfish)
 Benthodesmus simonyi, Steindachner, 1891 (Simony's frostfish)
 Benthodesmus suluensis, Parin, 1976 (Philippine frostfish)
 Benthodesmus tenuis, Günther, 1877 (Slender frostfish)
 Benthodesmus tuckeri, Parin & Becker, 1970 (Tucker's frostfish)
 Benthodesmus vityazi, Parin & Becker, 1970 (Vityaz' frostfish)

References

Denys W. Tucker B.Sc, F.Z.S. "The fishes of the genus Benthodesmus (Family Trichiuridae)". Proceedings of the Zoological  Society of London: Volume 123, Issue 1, pages 171–195, May 1953. DOI: 10.1111/j.1096-3642.1953.tb00163.x
 Tony Ayling & Geoffrey Cox, Collins Guide to the Sea Fishes of New Zealand,  (William Collins Publishers Ltd, Auckland, New Zealand 1982) 

Trichiuridae
Marine fish genera
Taxa named by Tarleton Hoffman Bean
Taxa named by George Brown Goode